Judi Chamberlin (née Rosenberg; October 30, 1944 – January 16, 2010) was an American activist, leader, organizer, public speaker and educator in the psychiatric survivors movement. Her political activism followed her involuntary confinement in a psychiatric facility in the 1960s. She was the author of On Our Own: Patient-Controlled Alternatives to the Mental Health System, which is a foundational text in the Mad Pride movement.

Early life
Judi Chamberlin was born Judith Rosenberg in Brooklyn in 1944. She was the only daughter of Harold and Shirley Jaffe Rosenberg. The family later changed their name to Ross. Her father was a factory worker when she was a child  and later worked as an executive in the advertising industry. Her mother was employed as a school secretary. Chamberlin graduated from Midwood High School. After graduation, she had no plans of attending college and worked as a secretary instead.

Psychiatric experience

In 1966, at the age of twenty-one and recently married, Chamberlin suffered a miscarriage and, according to her own account, became severely depressed. Following psychiatric advice, she voluntarily signed herself into a psychiatric facility as an in-patient. However, after several voluntary admissions  she was diagnosed with schizophrenia and involuntarily committed to a psychiatric ward at Mt. Sinai Hospital in New York state for a period of five months.

As an involuntary patient, she witnessed and experienced a range of abuses. Seclusion rooms and refractory wards were used for resistive patients, even when their forms of resistance were non-violent. The psychiatric medication she was given made her feel tired and affected her memory. As an involuntary patient she was unable to leave the facility and became, she said, "a prisoner of the system". The derogation of her civil liberties that she experienced as an inmate provided the impetus for her activism as a member of the psychiatric survivor movement.

Activism

Following her discharge, Chamberlin became involved in the nascent psychiatric patients' rights movement. In 1971 she joined the Boston-based Mental Patients Liberation Front (MPLF), and she also became associated with the Center for Psychiatric Rehabilitation at Boston University . Her affiliation with this center facilitated her role in co-founding the Ruby Rogers Advocacy and Drop-in-Centers, which are self-help institutions staffed by former psychiatric patients.  and was also a founder and later a Director of Education of the National Empowerment Center. The latter is also an ex-patient run organization that provides information, technical assistance, and support to users and survivors of the psychiatric system. Its mission statement declares its intent is to "carry a message of recovery, empowerment, hope and healing to people who have been labeled with mental illness".

She was also involved with the National Association for Rights Protection and Advocacy and was an influential leader in the Mad Pride movement.

Chamberlin met David Oaks in 1976, when he was the chief executive of MindFreedom International. They were both members of the Mental Patients Liberation Front. She later became a board member of MindFreedom International, an umbrella organization for approximately one hundred grass roots groups campaigning for the human rights of people labeled "mentally ill."

In 1978, her book On Our Own: Patient Controlled Alternatives to the Mental Health System was published. It became the standard text of the psychiatric survivor movement, and in it Chamberlain coined the word "mentalism." She used the word "mentalism" also in a book chapter in 1975.

She was a major contributor to the National Council on Disability's report From Privileges to Rights:  People Labeled with Psychiatric Disabilities Speak for Themselves, which was published in 2000. The report argued that psychiatric patients should enjoy the same basic human rights as other citizens and that patient privileges contingent on good behavior within the psychiatric system, such as the ability to wear their own clothes, leave the confines of a psychiatric facility, or receive visitors, should instead be regarded as basic rights.

Chamberlin was elected as co-chair of the World Network of Users and Survivors of Psychiatry (WNUSP) at the launching conference and General Assembly in Vancouver, British Columbia, Canada in 2001, and served in this capacity until the next General Assembly in 2004. During this period she also served on the Panel of Experts advising the United Nations special rapporteur on disability, on behalf of WNUSP in its role as a Non-governmental organization, representing psychiatric survivors.

She appears in the 2011 disability rights documentary Lives Worth Living.

Personal life
Her marriages to Robert Chamberlin, Ted Chabasinski, and Howard Cahn ended in divorce. Chamberlin met Chabasinski, also an early member of the psychiatric survivor movement, in 1971 at the initial meeting of the Mental Patients Liberation Project in New York City. From 2006 until her death, Chamberlin's partner was Martin Federman. She has one daughter, Julie Chamberlin, and three grandchildren, Edward, Kyle, and Vivian.

Death
Chamberlin died from chronic lung disease at her home in Arlington, Massachusetts on January 16, 2010.<ref name=WPObit>{{cite news|url=https://www.washingtonpost.com/wp-dyn/content/article/2010/01/20/AR2010012004742.html|title=Obituaries: Judi Chamberlin Disability Rights Advocate|newspaper=Washington Post|date=January 21, 2010}}</ref>

Published works
 
 
 Chamberlin, Judi (1993). 'Erfahrungen und Zielsetzungen der nordamerikanischen Selbsthilfebewegung' (pp. 300–317). In: Kerstin Kempker / Peter Lehmann (Eds.), Statt Psychiatrie. Berlin: Antipsychiatrieverlag. 
 
 
 
 
 
  
 Chamberlin, Judi (2004). Preface to: Peter Lehmann (ed.), Coming off Psychiatric Drugs: Successful withdrawal from neuroleptics, antidepressants, lithium, carbamazepine and tranquilizers (pp. 11–13). Berlin / Eugene / Shrewsbury: Peter Lehmann Publishing.  (UK),  (USA). E-Book in 2018.
 Chamberlin, Judi (2014). Πρόλογος. στο: Πέτερ Λέμαν & Άννα Εμμανουηλίδου (επιμ.), Βγαί νοντας από τα ψυχοφάρμακα – Εμπειρίες επιτυχημένης διακοπής νευροληπτικών, αντικαταθλιπτικών, σταθεροποιητών διάθεσης, Ριταλίν και ηρεμιστικών'' (σ. 16–21). 2η διορθωμένη και βελτιωμένη έκδοση. Θεσσαλονίκη: εκδ. Νησίδες. .

Awards
1992: Distinguished Service Award of the President of the United States, National Council on Disability
1992: David J. Vail National Advocacy Award, Mental Health Association of Minnesota
1995: N. Neal Pike Prize for Services to People with Disabilities, Boston University School of Law

See also
 MindFreedom International
 Psychiatric survivors movement
 World Network of Users and Survivors of Psychiatry
 National Council on Disability
 National Empowerment Center
 Anti-psychiatry
 Psychiatric survivors movement
 Involuntary commitment
 Biopsychiatry controversy
 Involuntary treatment

References

External links
National Empowerment Center
Judi Chamberlin's virtual memorial
MindFreedom International: Tribute to Judi Chamberlin (David Oaks)
Judi's Tribute Book
Robin Pape: Biography of Judi Chamberlin in: Biographical Archive of Psychiatry (BIAPSY), 2015.
Judi Chamberlin Papers, 1944-2010 (bulk 1970-2006): Digital archives collection maintained by the UMass Amherst Special Collections and University Archives

1944 births
People with schizophrenia
2010 deaths
Psychiatric survivor activists
People from Brooklyn
People from Arlington, Massachusetts
Midwood High School alumni
Activists from New York (state)